Axis is a live solo album by pianist Paul Bley recorded in New York in 1977 and released on Bley's own Improvising Artists label the following year.

Reception

Allmusic awarded the album 4½ stars stating "This is one of Bley's most painterly and moving solo dates". The Penguin Guide to Jazz called it "a meditative and in some ways rather melancholy set" and "an intriguing blend of styles and ideas".

Track listing
All compositions by Paul Bley except as indicated
 "Axis" - 16:01	
 "Porgy" (George Gershwin) - 3:38	
 "Music Matador" (Prince Lasha) - 4:48	
 "El Cordobes-Please Don't Ever Leave Me" - 5:48

Personnel 
Paul Bley - piano

References 

1978 live albums
Paul Bley live albums
Improvising Artists Records live albums
Solo piano jazz albums